Advanced Vector Extensions (AVX) are extensions to the x86 instruction set architecture for microprocessors from Intel and Advanced Micro Devices (AMD).  They were proposed by Intel in March 2008 and first supported by Intel with the Sandy Bridge processor shipping in Q1 2011 and later by AMD with the Bulldozer processor shipping in Q3 2011. AVX provides new features, new instructions and a new coding scheme.

AVX2 (also known as Haswell New Instructions) expands most integer commands to 256 bits and introduces new instructions. They were first supported by Intel with the Haswell processor, which shipped in 2013.

AVX-512 expands AVX to 512-bit support using a new EVEX prefix encoding proposed by Intel in July 2013 and first supported by Intel with the Knights Landing co-processor, which shipped in 2016. In conventional processors, AVX-512 was introduced with Skylake server and HEDT processors in 2017.

Advanced Vector Extensions 
AVX uses sixteen YMM registers to perform a single instruction on multiple pieces of data (see SIMD). Each YMM register can hold and do simultaneous operations (math) on:
 eight 32-bit single-precision floating point numbers or
 four 64-bit double-precision floating point numbers.

The width of the SIMD registers is increased from 128 bits to 256 bits, and renamed from XMM0–XMM7 to YMM0–YMM7 (in x86-64 mode, from XMM0–XMM15 to YMM0–YMM15). The legacy SSE instructions can be still utilized via the VEX prefix to operate on the lower 128 bits of the YMM registers.

AVX introduces a three-operand SIMD instruction format called VEX coding scheme, where the destination register is distinct from the two source operands. For example, an SSE instruction using the conventional two-operand form  can now use a non-destructive three-operand form , preserving both source operands. Originally, AVX's three-operand format was limited to the instructions with SIMD operands (YMM), and did not include instructions with general purpose registers (e.g. EAX). It was later used for coding new instructions on general purpose registers in later extensions, such as BMI. VEX coding is also used for instructions operating on the k0-k7 mask registers that were introduced with AVX-512.

The alignment requirement of SIMD memory operands is relaxed. Unlike their non-VEX coded counterparts, most VEX coded vector instructions no longer require their memory operands to be aligned to the vector size. Notably, the VMOVDQA instruction still requires its memory operand to be aligned.

The new VEX coding scheme introduces a new set of code prefixes that extends the opcode space, allows instructions to have more than two operands, and allows SIMD vector registers to be longer than 128 bits. The VEX prefix can also be used on the legacy SSE instructions giving them a three-operand form, and making them interact more efficiently with AVX instructions without the need for VZEROUPPER and VZEROALL.

The AVX instructions support both 128-bit and 256-bit SIMD. The 128-bit versions can be useful to improve old code without needing to widen the vectorization, and avoid the penalty of going from SSE to AVX, they are also faster on some early AMD implementations of AVX. This mode is sometimes known as AVX-128.

New instructions 
These AVX instructions are in addition to the ones that are 256-bit extensions of the legacy 128-bit SSE instructions; most are usable on both 128-bit and 256-bit operands.

CPUs with AVX 
 Intel
 Sandy Bridge processors, Q1 2011
 Sandy Bridge E processors, Q4 2011
 Ivy Bridge processors, Q1 2012
 Ivy Bridge E processors, Q3 2013
 Haswell processors, Q2 2013
 Haswell E processors, Q3 2014
 Broadwell processors, Q4 2014
 Skylake processors, Q3 2015
 Broadwell E processors, Q2 2016
 Kaby Lake processors, Q3 2016 (ULV mobile)/Q1 2017 (desktop/mobile)
 Skylake-X processors, Q2 2017
 Coffee Lake processors, Q4 2017
 Cannon Lake processors, Q2 2018
 Whiskey Lake processors, Q3 2018
 Cascade Lake processors, Q4 2018
 Ice Lake processors, Q3 2019
 Comet Lake processors (only Core and Xeon branded), Q3 2019
 Tiger Lake (Core, Pentium and Celeron branded) processors, Q3 2020
 Rocket Lake processors, Q1 2021
 Alder Lake (Xeon, Core, Pentium and Celeron branded) processors, Q4 2021. Supported both in Golden Cove P-cores and Gracemont E-cores.
 Raptor Lake processors, Q4 2022
 Sapphire Rapids processors, Q1 2023
 Meteor Lake processors
 Arrow Lake processors
 Lunar Lake processors
Not all CPUs from the listed families support AVX. Generally, CPUs with the commercial denomination Core i3/i5/i7/i9 support them, whereas Pentium and Celeron CPUs before Tiger Lake do not.
 AMD:
 Jaguar-based processors and newer
 Puma-based processors and newer
 "Heavy Equipment" processors
 Bulldozer-based processors, Q4 2011
 Piledriver-based processors, Q4 2012
 Steamroller-based processors, Q1 2014
 Excavator-based processors and newer, 2015
 Zen-based processors, Q1 2017
 Zen+-based processors, Q2 2018
 Zen 2-based processors, Q3 2019
 Zen 3 processors, Q4 2020
 Zen 4 processors, Q4 2022
Issues regarding compatibility between future Intel and AMD processors are discussed under XOP instruction set.
 VIA:
 Nano QuadCore
 Eden X4
 Zhaoxin:
 WuDaoKou-based processors (KX-5000 and KH-20000)

Compiler and assembler support 
 Absoft supports with - flag.
 The Free Pascal compiler supports AVX and AVX2 with the -CfAVX and -CfAVX2 switches from version 2.7.1.
 RAD studio (v11.0 Alexandria) supports AVX2 and AVX512.
 The GNU Assembler (GAS) inline assembly functions support these instructions (accessible via GCC), as do Intel primitives and the Intel inline assembler (closely compatible to GAS, although more general in its handling of local references within inline code).
 GCC starting with version 4.6 (although there was a 4.3 branch with certain support) and the Intel Compiler Suite starting with version 11.1 support AVX.
 The Open64 compiler version 4.5.1 supports AVX with - flag.
 PathScale supports via the - flag.
 The Vector Pascal compiler supports AVX via the - flag.
 The Visual Studio 2010/2012 compiler supports AVX via intrinsic and  switch.
 Other assemblers such as MASM VS2010 version, YASM, FASM, NASM and JWASM.

Operating system support 
AVX adds new register-state through the 256-bit wide YMM register file, so explicit operating system support is required to properly save and restore AVX's expanded registers between context switches. The following operating system versions support AVX:
 DragonFly BSD: support added in early 2013.
 FreeBSD: support added in a patch submitted on January 21, 2012, which was included in the 9.1 stable release
 Linux: supported since kernel version 2.6.30, released on June 9, 2009.
 macOS: support added in 10.6.8 (Snow Leopard) update released on June 23, 2011.  In fact, Intel Macs starting Ventura does not support processors without the AVX2 instruction set. 
 OpenBSD: support added on March 21, 2015.
 Solaris: supported in Solaris 10 Update 10 and Solaris 11
 Windows: supported in Windows 7 SP1, Windows Server 2008 R2 SP1, Windows 8, Windows 10
 Windows Server 2008 R2 SP1 with Hyper-V requires a hotfix to support AMD AVX (Opteron 6200 and 4200 series) processors, KB2568088

Advanced Vector Extensions 2 
Advanced Vector Extensions 2 (AVX2), also known as Haswell New Instructions, is an expansion of the AVX instruction set introduced in Intel's Haswell microarchitecture. AVX2 makes the following additions:
 expansion of most vector integer SSE and AVX instructions to 256 bits
 Gather support, enabling vector elements to be loaded from non-contiguous memory locations
 DWORD- and QWORD-granularity any-to-any permutes
 vector shifts.
Sometimes three-operand fused multiply-accumulate (FMA3) extension is considered part of AVX2, as it was introduced by Intel in the same processor microarchitecture. This is a separate extension using its own CPUID flag and is described on its own page and not below.

New instructions

CPUs with AVX2 
 Intel
 Haswell processors (only Core and Xeon branded), Q2 2013
 Haswell E processors, Q3 2014
 Broadwell processors, Q4 2014
 Broadwell E processors, Q3 2016
 Skylake processors, Q3 2015
 Kaby Lake processors, Q3 2016 (ULV mobile)/Q1 2017 (desktop/mobile)
 Skylake-X processors, Q2 2017
 Coffee Lake processors, Q4 2017
 Cannon Lake processors, Q2 2018
 Cascade Lake processors, Q2 2019
 Ice Lake processors, Q3 2019
 Comet Lake processors, Q3 2019
 Tiger Lake (Core, Pentium and Celeron branded) processors, Q3 2020
 Rocket Lake processors, Q1 2021
 Alder Lake (Xeon, Core, Pentium and Celeron branded) processors, Q4 2021. Supported both in Golden Cove P-cores and Gracemont E-cores.
 Raptor Lake processors, Q4 2022
 Sapphire Rapids processors, Q1 2023
 Meteor Lake processors
 Arrow Lake processors
 Lunar Lake processors
 AMD
 
 Excavator processor and newer, Q2 2015
 Zen processors, Q1 2017
 Zen+ processors, Q2 2018
 Zen 2 processors, Q3 2019
 Zen 3 processors, Q4 2020
 Zen 4 processors, Q4 2022
 VIA:
 Nano QuadCore
 Eden X4

AVX-512 

AVX-512 are 512-bit extensions to the 256-bit Advanced Vector Extensions SIMD instructions for x86 instruction set architecture proposed by Intel in July 2013, and are supported with Intel's Knights Landing processor.

AVX-512 instructions are encoded with the new EVEX prefix. It allows 4 operands, 8 new 64-bit opmask registers, scalar memory mode with automatic broadcast, explicit rounding control, and compressed displacement memory addressing mode. The width of the register file is increased to 512 bits and total register count increased to 32 (registers ZMM0-ZMM31) in x86-64 mode.

AVX-512 consists of multiple instruction subsets, not all of which are meant to be supported by all processors implementing them. The instruction set consists of the following:
 AVX-512 Foundation (F) adds several new instructions and expands most 32-bit and 64-bit floating point SSE-SSE4.1 and AVX/AVX2 instructions with EVEX coding scheme to support the 512-bit registers, operation masks, parameter broadcasting, and embedded rounding and exception control
 AVX-512 Conflict Detection Instructions (CD) efficient conflict detection to allow more loops to be vectorized, supported by Knights Landing
 AVX-512 Exponential and Reciprocal Instructions (ER) exponential and reciprocal operations designed to help implement transcendental operations, supported by Knights Landing
 AVX-512 Prefetch Instructions (PF) new prefetch capabilities, supported by Knights Landing
 AVX-512 Vector Length Extensions (VL) extends most AVX-512 operations to also operate on XMM (128-bit) and YMM (256-bit) registers (including XMM16-XMM31 and YMM16-YMM31 in x86-64 mode)
 AVX-512 Byte and Word Instructions (BW) extends AVX-512 to cover 8-bit and 16-bit integer operations
 AVX-512 Doubleword and Quadword Instructions (DQ) enhanced 32-bit and 64-bit integer operations
 AVX-512 Integer Fused Multiply Add (IFMA) fused multiply add for 512-bit integers.
 AVX-512 Vector Byte Manipulation Instructions (VBMI) adds vector byte permutation instructions which are not present in AVX-512BW.
 AVX-512 Vector Neural Network Instructions Word variable precision (4VNNIW) vector instructions for deep learning.
 AVX-512 Fused Multiply Accumulation Packed Single precision (4FMAPS) vector instructions for deep learning.
 VPOPCNTDQ count of bits set to 1.
 VPCLMULQDQ carry-less multiplication of quadwords.
 AVX-512 Vector Neural Network Instructions (VNNI) vector instructions for deep learning.
 AVX-512 Galois Field New Instructions (GFNI) vector instructions for calculating Galois field.
 AVX-512 Vector AES instructions (VAES) vector instructions for AES coding.
 AVX-512 Vector Byte Manipulation Instructions 2 (VBMI2) byte/word load, store and concatenation with shift.
 AVX-512 Bit Algorithms (BITALG) byte/word bit manipulation instructions expanding VPOPCNTDQ.
 AVX-512 Bfloat16 Floating-Point Instructions (BF16) vector instructions for AI acceleration.
 AVX-512 Half-Precision Floating-Point Instructions (FP16) vector instructions for operating on floating-point and complex numbers with reduced precision.
Only the core extension AVX-512F (AVX-512 Foundation) is required by all implementations, though all current processors also support CD (conflict detection); computing coprocessors will additionally support ER, PF, 4VNNIW, 4FMAPS, and VPOPCNTDQ, while central processors will support VL, DQ, BW, IFMA, VBMI, VPOPCNTDQ, VPCLMULQDQ etc.

The updated SSE/AVX instructions in AVX-512F use the same mnemonics as AVX versions; they can operate on 512-bit ZMM registers, and will also support 128/256 bit XMM/YMM registers (with AVX-512VL) and byte, word, doubleword and quadword integer operands (with AVX-512BW/DQ and VBMI).

CPUs with AVX-512 

: AVX-512 is disabled by default in Alder Lake processors. On some motherboards with some BIOS versions, AVX-512 can be enabled in the BIOS, but this requires disabling E-cores. However, Intel has begun fusing AVX-512 off of new Alder Lake processors.

Compilers supporting AVX-512 
 GCC 4.9 and newer
 Clang 3.9 and newer
 ICC 15.0.1 and newer
 Microsoft Visual Studio 2017 C++ Compiler

AVX-VNNI 
AVX-VNNI is a VEX-coded variant of the AVX512-VNNI instruction set extension. It provides the same set of operations, but is limited to 256-bit vectors and does not support any additional features of EVEX encoding, such as broadcasting, opmask registers or accessing more than 16 vector registers. This extension allows to support VNNI operations even when full AVX-512 support is not implemented in the processor.

CPUs with AVX-VNNI 
 Intel
 Alder Lake processors, Q4 2021
 Raptor Lake processors, Q4 2022
 Sapphire Rapids processors, Q1 2023
 Meteor Lake processors
 Emerald Rapids processors
 Arrow Lake processors
 Lunar Lake processors

Applications 
 Suitable for floating point-intensive calculations in multimedia, scientific and financial applications (AVX2 adds support for integer operations).
 Increases parallelism and throughput in floating point SIMD calculations.
 Reduces register load due to the non-destructive instructions.
 Improves Linux RAID software performance (required AVX2, AVX is not sufficient)

Software 
 Blender uses AVX, AVX2 and AVX-512 in the Cycles render engine.
 Bloombase uses AVX, AVX2 and AVX-512 in their Bloombase Cryptographic Module (BCM).
 Botan uses both AVX and AVX2 when available to accelerate some algorithms, like ChaCha.
 Crypto++ uses both AVX and AVX2 when available to accelerate some algorithms, like Salsa and ChaCha.
 OpenSSL uses AVX- and AVX2-optimized cryptographic functions since version 1.0.2. Support for AVX-512 was added in version 3.0.0. Some of this support is also present in various clones and forks, like LibreSSL.
 Prime95/MPrime, the software used for GIMPS, started using the AVX instructions since version 27.1, AVX2 since 28.6 and AVX-512 since 29.1.
 dav1d AV1 decoder can use AVX2 and AVX-512 on supported CPUs.
 SVT-AV1 AV1 encoder can use AVX2 and AVX-512 to accelerate video encoding.
 dnetc, the software used by distributed.net, has an AVX2 core available for its RC5 project and will soon release one for its OGR-28 project.
 Einstein@Home uses AVX in some of their distributed applications that search for gravitational waves.
 Folding@home uses AVX on calculation cores implemented with GROMACS library.
 Helios uses AVX and AVX2 hardware acceleration on 64-bit x86 hardware.
 Horizon: Zero Dawn uses AVX in its Decima game engine.
 RPCS3, an open source PlayStation 3 emulator, uses AVX2 and AVX-512 instructions to emulate PS3 games.
 Network Device Interface, an IP video/audio protocol developed by NewTek for live broadcast production, uses AVX and AVX2 for increased performance.
 TensorFlow since version 1.6 and tensorflow above versions requires CPU supporting at least AVX.
 x264, x265 and VTM video encoders can use AVX2 or AVX-512 to speed up encoding.
 Various CPU-based cryptocurrency miners (like pooler's cpuminer for Bitcoin and Litecoin) use AVX and AVX2 for various cryptography-related routines, including SHA-256 and scrypt.
 libsodium uses AVX in the implementation of scalar multiplication for Curve25519 and Ed25519 algorithms, AVX2 for BLAKE2b, Salsa20, ChaCha20, and AVX2 and AVX-512 in implementation of Argon2 algorithm.
 libvpx open source reference implementation of VP8/VP9 encoder/decoder, uses AVX2 or AVX-512 when available.
 FFTW can utilize AVX, AVX2 and AVX-512 when available.
 LLVMpipe, a software OpenGL renderer in Mesa using Gallium and LLVM infrastructure, uses AVX2 when available.
 glibc uses AVX2 (with FMA) and AVX-512 for optimized implementation of various mathematical (i.e. expf, sinf, powf, atanf, atan2f) and string (memmove, memcpy, etc.) functions in libc.
 Linux kernel can use AVX or AVX2, together with AES-NI as optimized implementation of AES-GCM cryptographic algorithm.
 Linux kernel uses AVX or AVX2 when available, in optimized implementation of multiple other cryptographic ciphers: Camellia, CAST5, CAST6, Serpent, Twofish, MORUS-1280, and other primitives: Poly1305, SHA-1, SHA-256, SHA-512, ChaCha20.
 POCL, a portable Computing Language, that provides implementation of OpenCL, makes use of AVX, AVX2 and AVX-512 when possible.
 .NET and .NET Framework can utilize AVX, AVX2 through the generic System.Numerics.Vectors namespace.
 .NET Core, starting from version 2.1 and more extensively after version 3.0 can directly use all AVX, AVX2 intrinsics through the System.Runtime.Intrinsics.X86 namespace.
 EmEditor 19.0 and above uses AVX2 to speed up processing.
 Native Instruments' Massive X softsynth requires AVX.
 Microsoft Teams uses AVX2 instructions to create a blurred or custom background behind video chat participants, and for background noise suppression.
 Pale Moon custom Windows builds greatly increase browsing speed due to the use of AVX2.
 , a JSON parsing library, uses AVX2 and AVX-512 to achieve improved decoding speed.
 Tesseract OCR engine uses AVX, AVX2 and AVX-512 to accelerate character recognition.

Downclocking 
Since AVX instructions are wider and generate more heat, some Intel processors have provisions to reduce the Turbo Boost frequency limit when such instructions are being executed. On Skylake and its derivatives, the throttling is divided into three levels:
 L0 (100%): The normal turbo boost limit.
 L1 (~85%): The "AVX boost" limit. Soft-triggered by 256-bit "heavy" (floating-point unit: FP math and integer multiplication) instructions. Hard-triggered by "light" (all other) 512-bit instructions.
 L2 (~60%): The "AVX-512 boost" limit. Soft-triggered by 512-bit heavy instructions.

The frequency transition can be soft or hard. Hard transition means the frequency is reduced as soon as such an instruction is spotted; soft transition means that the frequency is reduced only after reaching a threshold number of matching instructions. The limit is per-thread.

In Ice Lake, only two levels persist:
 L0 (100%): The normal turbo boost limit.
 L1 (~97%): Triggered by any 512-bit instructions, but only when single-core boost is active; not triggered when multiple cores are loaded.

Rocket Lake processors do not trigger frequency reduction upon executing any kind of vector instructions regardless of the vector size. However, downclocking can still happen due to other reasons, such as reaching thermal and power limits.

Downclocking means that using AVX in a mixed workload with an Intel processor can incur a frequency penalty despite it being faster in a "pure" context. Avoiding the use of wide and heavy instructions help minimize the impact in these cases. AVX-512VL allows for using 256-bit or 128-bit operands in AVX-512, making it a sensible default for mixed loads.

On supported and unlocked variants of processors that down-clock, the ratios are adjustable and may be turned off (set to 0x) entirely via Intel's Overclocking / Tuning utility or in BIOS if supported there.

See also 
 Memory Protection Extensions
 Scalable Vector Extension for ARM - a new vector instruction set (supplementing VFP and NEON) similar to AVX-512, with some additional features.

References

External links 
 Intel Intrinsics Guide
 x86 Assembly Language Reference Manual

X86 instructions
SIMD computing
AMD technologies